Bermeo Futbol Taldea is a Spanish football team based in Bermeo, Biscay, in the autonomous community of Basque Country. Founded in 1950 it plays in Tercera División – Group 4, holding home matches at Estadio Municipal Itxas Gane, which has a 3,000-seat capacity.

Club background
Club Bermeo - (1950–11)
Bermeo Futbol Taldea - (2011–)

Season to season

7 seasons in Segunda División B
14 seasons in Tercera División

External links
Official website 
Futbolme team profile 

Football clubs in the Basque Country (autonomous community)
Association football clubs established in 1950
1950 establishments in Spain